Steven Levenkron (born 1941) is an American psychotherapist and writer known for his research into anorexia nervosa and self-injury. He lives in New York, where his practice is based.

Levenkron started his research in 1970 and later took part in the National Association of Anorexia Nervosa and Associated Disorders. He gained popularity due to his 1978 novel The Best Little Girl in the World, which was recognized as a Best Books for Young Adults by the American Library Association and which later formed the basis of the American Broadcasting Company's television film The Best Little Girl in the World.

His notable clients included Karen Carpenter, who died in 1983.

In 1998, W. W. Norton & Company published Levenkron's non-fiction book Cutting: Understanding and Overcoming Self-Mutilation. In the book, he insisted that self-injury was not related to suicide in essentials.

His book The Luckiest Girl in the World is the original work of the 2000 television movie Secret Cutting, produced by USA Network.

Levenkron's website states that his patient recovery rate is over 90%.

Publications
stolen tomorrows, 2007
Treating and Overcoming Anorexia Nervosa, 1982
Obsessive Compulsive Disorders, 1991
Cutting, Understanding & Overcoming Self-Mutilation, 1998
Anatomy of Anorexia, 2000
The Best Little Girl in the World - work of fiction, also produced as a movie
The Luckiest Girl in the World - work of fiction, also produced as a movie under the title Secret Cutting
Kessa - work of fiction
the 8 books above have all been translated into 7 different foreign languages

References

External links
Levekron.com - his personal website

1941 births
Living people
21st-century American psychologists
American writers of young adult literature
20th-century American novelists
American male novelists
20th-century American Jews
20th-century American male writers
21st-century American Jews
20th-century American psychologists